In Greek mythology, Lycurgus (Ancient Greek: Λυκοῦργος Lykoûrgos), also Lykurgos or Lykourgos, was a king of Tegea in Arcadia.

Family 
Lycurgus was the son of Aleus, the previous ruler of Tegea, and Neaera, daughter of Pereus, and thus, brother to the Argonauts Amphidamas, Cepheus, Auge and Alcidice. He married either Cleophyle, Eurynome or Antinoe and fathered these sons: Ancaeus, Epochus, Amphidamas, and Iasius.

Mythology 
Lycurgus was notorious for killing, by ambushing him, a warrior called Areithous. He attacked the man unexpectedly in a narrow passage where Areithous' famous club was useless. Lycurgus took Areithous' armor as spoils and wore it himself, but handed it over to Ereuthalion when he had grown old. According to scholia on the Argonautica, Ereuthalion was also vanquished by Lycurgus, who laid an ambush against him and overcame him in the ensuing battle. The Arcadians celebrated a feast known as Moleia in commemoration of this mythical event (mōlos being a word for "battle" according to the scholiast), and paid general honors to Lycurgus.

Lycurgus outlived his sons and reached an extreme old age for Epochus fell ill and died while Ancaeus was wounded by the Calydonian boar. On his death, he was succeeded by Echemus, son of Aeropus, son of his brother Cepheus.

Notes

References
Apollodorus, The Library with an English Translation by Sir James George Frazer, F.B.A., F.R.S. in 2 Volumes, Cambridge, MA, Harvard University Press; London, William Heinemann Ltd. 1921. . Online version at the Perseus Digital Library. Greek text available from the same website.
Homer, The Iliad with an English Translation by A.T. Murray, Ph.D. in two volumes. Cambridge, MA., Harvard University Press; London, William Heinemann, Ltd. 1924. . Online version at the Perseus Digital Library.
Homer, Homeri Opera in five volumes. Oxford, Oxford University Press. 1920. . Greek text available at the Perseus Digital Library.
Pausanias, Description of Greece with an English Translation by W.H.S. Jones, Litt.D., and H.A. Ormerod, M.A., in 4 Volumes. Cambridge, MA, Harvard University Press; London, William Heinemann Ltd. 1918. . Online version at the Perseus Digital Library
Pausanias, Graeciae Descriptio. 3 vols. Leipzig, Teubner. 1903.  Greek text available at the Perseus Digital Library.

Princes in Greek mythology
Mythological kings of Arcadia
Kings in Greek mythology
Arcadian characters in Greek mythology
Tegea